Aleksandr (Alex) Viktorovich Gurevich (b. September 19, 1930) is a Soviet and Russian physicist. In 1992 he proposed the theory of lightning initiation known as the "runaway breakdown".

Gurevich graduated from Moscow State University in 1952. In 1984 he became a Corresponding Member of the USSR Academy of Sciences (Russian Academy of Sciences since 1991). He was the head of the I. E. Tamm Theoretical Department at the Lebedev Physical Institute.  From 2010 he is the head of Academic Department of Physics and Astrophysics Problems in Moscow Institute of Physics and Technology.

Fields of Research
His work has focused on:

 Plasma kinetics (1955-)
 Ionospheric physics (1955-)
 Nonlinear dynamics of non-collisional plasmas (1963-)
 Nonlinear waves in dispersive hydrodynamics (1973-)
 Artificial ionized layers in the atmosphere (1977-) 
 The electrodynamics of neutron star magnetospheres (1983–1993)
 Nonlinear dynamics of dark matter (1988-)

References

External links
 Gurevich at I. E. Tamm Laboratory
 Studies of Plasma Instability Processes Excited by Ground Based High Power HF (Heating) Facilities (abstract)

Soviet physicists
20th-century Russian  physicists
Moscow State University alumni
1930 births
Corresponding Members of the USSR Academy of Sciences
Full Members of the Russian Academy of Sciences
Living people